The Men's omnium at the 2014 UCI Track Cycling World Championships was held on 28 February and 1 March 2014. 18 athletes participated in the contest. The final standings were determined by adding ranks in the six events; the rider with the lowest cumulative score won the gold medal.

Medalists

Results

Overall results

FL: 250m flying lap. PR: Points race. ER: Elimination race.
IP: 4000m individual pursuit. SR: Scratch race. TT: 1000m time trial.

Flying lap
The flying lap was held at 12:35.

Points race
The points race was held at 14:50.

Elimination race
The elimination race was held at 21:35.

Individual pursuit
The individual pursuit was held at 13:45.

Scratch race
The Scratch race was held at 19:05.

1 km time trial
The 1 km time trial was held at 21:05.

Final standings
After all events.

References

2014 UCI Track Cycling World Championships
UCI Track Cycling World Championships – Men's omnium